Pierre Schwarz (born in 1950 in Brussels) is a contemporary Belgian painter and engraver, neo-expressionist and muralist.

Biography 

"Student at the Academies of Arts of Brussels and Watermael-Boitsfort, Pierre Schwarz perfect himself with Oskar Kokoschka in Salzbourg.
He represent the representation without falling in the picture."

Training 

 1968 Academy of Arts of Watermael-Boitsfort (Teachers: Roger Somville, Lucien Braet)
 1973 Royal Academy of Arts, Brussels, Engraving degree received with distinction (Teacher Claude Lyr)
 1977 Royal Academy of Arts, Brussels, Monumental painting degree received with the greatest distinction and awards (Teacher Jean Ransy)
 1977 King's Medal and Medal of the City of Brussels for the Master's degree in monumental painting

Professional experience 

 1978 to 1981 Drawing and monumental painting teacher's assistant at the Royal Academy of Arts, Brussels,
 1982 until now Painting teacher at the Academy of Arts, Verviers

Solo exhibitions 
 1979 Cercle d'Education Populaire
 1980 Galerie "L'Escalier", Brussels
 1984 Galerie APART, Brussels
 1986 Librairie Télémaque, Brussels
 1987 Atelier Horta, Brussels
 1989 Galerie du Parvis, invited by M. Charles Picqué, bourgmestre de Saint-Gilles
 1989 Zoet Peper, Ruisbroeck
 1990 Totems-Tabous, Galerie "Now", Liège
 1990 "La Marotte", Theux
 1990 "Au Laboureur", Brussels
 1992 "La Vénerie ", Brussels
 1992 Espace d'Art Contemporain "L'Escale", Brussels
 1992 Centre Culturel "Silence les Dunes", Verviers
 1993 Nicola's, Brussels
 1993 "Au Petit Coq", Linkebeek
 1993 Prodivet, Eynatten
 1994 Ancienne Maison Bronfort, Sart-lez-Spa
 1996 Arte Coppo Verviers, "Tout doit partir"
 1996 Arte Coppo Verviers, "Telles façons"
 1997 Arte Coppo Verviers. "Côte à côte"
 1998 Centre Culturel de Chênée
 1999 OEuvres en chantier asbl "art Factory"
 2000 La convi, Soumagne
 2000 Fondation Adolphe Hardy
 2000 Archipelago 2000, Musée d'Evere, Cour Royale, Brussels
 2001 Castill'Art, France, été 2001, Diplôme d'Honneur
 2001 Musée de Herstal
 2002 Galerie Orpheu, Liège
 2004 Oziomelo Gallery, "Totems Tabous", Liège
 2008 Galerie Astelle, Liège
 2010 Oziomelo Gallery, Liège

Collective exhibitions 
Numerous participations to Belgian and international exhibitions :
 Analysis Situs,
 Fête de la Comunauté française,
 SRAVE de Verviers
 Belfort Crypte te Aalst
 Cercle des Beaux-Arts de Verviers
 Fondation Pierre-Paul Hamesse. Brussels
 Vibrations Judaïques, Brussels
 CCLJ
 Parcours d'Artiste 2. Brussels
 Peintures Fraîches, Verviers
 Artistes en Fête, Overijse
 Archipelago, Brussels
 Expo-Solidarité, Verviers
 L'Appartement, Germany
 "Du Bon Usage de l'Emballage"
 Deux cents miniatures contemporaines, Musee des Beaux-Arts de Verviers
 Cercle Royal des Beaux-Arts, 2005
 Cercle Royal des Beaux-Arts, 2006
 Mobil'Art Musée St Georges, Liège, 2007
 Atelier d'Emanuelle, Liège, 2007
 Cercle Royal des Beaux-Arts, 2008
 Galerie l'Astelle, 2008
 Lisbonne, 2009
 Cercle Royal des Beaux-Arts, 2010

Private collections 

Private collections in :
 UK
 France
 Israël
 United States
 Hong Kong
 New Zealand
 Monaco
 Japan

Miscellany 
 Member of asbl "Silence les Dunes ". Verviers
 Member of asbl "Art Factory", Liège
 Participation in the movie Boris Lehman "Leçon de Vie"
 Charter 3000 (mise en scène théatrale et technique audiovisuelle), Sculptures
 Hommage à l'Abstraction Belge
 Paintings for "la Maison Delvaux"
 Hommage à Roger Somville, octobre 1998

Bibliography 
 Totems Tabous. Oeuvres de Pierre Schwarz, textes de Marianne Van den Broeck et Philippe Hunt, 2002
 Cheminant, il n'y a pas de chemin - Quelques itinérances avec Pierre Schwarz, Philippe Hunt, 2003

Notes and references 

Belgian painters
1950 births
Living people